Manon Arcangioli and Kimberley Zimmermann were the defending champions, having won the previous edition in 2019, however both players chose not to participate.

Oksana Selekhmeteva and Daniela Vismane won the title, defeating Sarah Beth Grey and Magali Kempen in the final, 6–3, 7–6(7–5).

Seeds

Draw

Draw

References
Main Draw

Engie Open de Biarritz - Doubles